Taichang (28 August 1620 – 21 January 1621) was the era name of the Taichang Emperor, the 15th emperor of the Ming dynasty of China. On 28 August 1620 (Wanli 48, 1st day of the 8th month), after the Taichang Emperor ascended to the throne, he continued to use the Wanli era name. There was an edict to change the era to Taichang on 22 January 1621 (New Year's Day of the Xinyou year of the second year). However, the Taichang Emperor fell ill shortly after he ascended the throne, and died on 26 September 1620 (1st day of the 9th month), reigned for only 30 days. On 1 October of the same year (6th day of the 9th month), after the Tianqi Emperor ascended to the throne, he issued an edict to change from 28 August 1620 (1st day of the 8th month) to 21 January 1621 (New Year's Eve, 29th day of the 12th month) as Taichang 1 (泰昌元年, "the first year of the Taichang era"). On 22 January 1621 (New Year's Day of the Xinyou year of the second year), the era was changed to Tianqi. Therefore, the era name "Taichang" was only used for four months.

Comparison table

Other regime era names that existed during the same period
 China
 Tianming (天命, 1616–1626): Later Jin — era name of Nurhaci
 Vietnam
 Vĩnh Tộ (永祚, 1619–1629): Later Lê dynasty — era name of Lê Thần Tông
 Long Thái (隆泰, 1618–1625): Mạc dynasty — era name of Mạc Kính Khoan
 Japan
 Genna (元和, 1615–1624): era name of Emperor Go-Mizunoo

See also
 List of Chinese era names
 List of Ming dynasty era names

References

Further reading

Ming dynasty eras